Jurgis and Jurģis are male given names. They are cognates of George. They may refer to:

Jurgis Baltrušaitis (1873–1944), Lithuanian Symbolist poet and translator
Jurgis Baltrušaitis (son) (1903–1988), Lithuanian art historian
Jurgis Bielinis (1846–1918), book smuggler
Jurgis Blekaitis (1917–2007), Lithuanian American theatre producer
Jurgis Dobkevičius (1900–1926), Lithuanian aviator
Jurgis Gedminas, Lithuanian cyclist
Jurgis Hardingsonas (1892–1936), Lithuanian footballer
Jurgis Jurgelis (born 1942), Lithuanian politician
Jurgis Kairys (born 1952), Lithuanian aerobatic pilot and aeronautical engineer
Jurgis Karnavičius (born 1957), Lithuanian pianist
Jurgis Karnavičius (composer) (1884–1941), Lithuanian composer
Jurgis Kunčinas (1947–2002), Lithuanian poet, novelist and essayist 
Jurgis Maciunas (1931–1978), Lithuanian American artist
Jurgis Matulaitis-Matulevičius (1871–1927), Roman Catholic bishop of Vilnius
Jurģis Pučinskis (born 1973), Latvian soccer player
Jurgis Šaulys (1879–1948), Lithuanian economist, politician and diplomat

Fictional characters
Jurgis Rudkus, a character from the novel The Jungle by Upton Sinclair

References

Masculine given names
Latvian masculine given names
Lithuanian masculine given names